USS Navigator may refer to the following ships of the United States Navy:

  a harbor tugboat built in 1898 and struck in 1946
  a  built in 1944 and struck in 1962.

United States Navy ship names